Sanopus is a genus of toadfishes restricted to the Atlantic coast of Central America and Mexico.

Species
The recognized species in this genus are:
 Sanopus astrifer (C. R. Robins & Starck, 1965) (whitespotted toadfish)
 Sanopus barbatus (Meek & Hildebrand, 1928) (bearded toadfish)
 Sanopus greenfieldorum Collette, 1983 (whitelined toadfish)
 Sanopus johnsoni Collette & Starck, 1974 (Cozumel toadfish)
 Sanopus reticulatus Collette, 1983 (reticulated toadfish)
 Sanopus splendidus Collette, Starck & P. C. Phillips, 1974 (splendid toadfish or coral toadfish)

References 

 
Batrachoididae
Taxonomy articles created by Polbot